Paul-Charles Ermens (June 8, 1884 – November 1, 1957) was a senior Force Publique officer, Vice-governor general of the Belgian Congo and Commander of the Force Publique. His most famous post was when he served as the commander of the Force Publique in World War II.

Career
He graduated in 1903 from the Belgian Royal Military Academy and joined the Royal grenadiers regiment. In 1914 he was an officer in the Force Publique, on August 4, 1914, he was promoted to Captain-commandant. He commanded the 3rd battalion of the Force Publique in the East African Campaign (World War I), for his service he was awarded the title of knight in the Order of the African Star. In 1918 he became Commander of the Force Publique in East Africa. In 1925 he became General and was appointed as commander of the Force Publique. In 1930 he didn't agree with the plans to reform the Force Publique and returned to Belgium. In 1932 he was appointed as vice-governor general of the Belgian Congo and governor of Congo-Kasaï, and became the assistant of governor general Pierre Ryckmans. During World War II he was appointed as Lieutenant general and Commander of the Force Publique. After the war he was reappointed as vice-governor general until the end of his career.

Honors and awards

 Commemorative Medal of the 1914–1917 African Campaigns
 1940–1945 African War Medal
 Knight in the Order of the African Star

References
Informational notes

Citations

Bibliography
 Jacques VANDERLINDEN (1994). Pierre Ryckmans, 1891-1959, Coloniser dans l'honneur. Brussel, De Boeck Université, p.539.

1884 births
1957 deaths
Belgian military personnel of World War I
Officers of the Force Publique
Belgian Congo officials
Military personnel from Brussels
Royal Military Academy (Belgium) alumni
Belgian generals
Governors of provinces of the Belgian Congo
Governors of Kasaï (former province)